Edwardsya is a genus of spiders in the family Salticidae. It was first described in 2016 by Ruiz & Bustamante. , it contains 2 species, both from Brazil. The genus is placed in subtribe Freyina, part of the Salticoida clade in the subfamily Salticinae.

References

Salticidae
Salticidae genera
Spiders of Brazil